Boultham Moor is a suburb (and former village) in the district of the City of Lincoln, Lincolnshire, England.

Geography
The suburb lies within the parish of Boultham, which is the name of the suburb directly to the north. Boultham Moor covers the southern area of Boultham parish with Skellingthorpe Road to the north, Rookery Lane to the east, Newark Road (A1434) and Doddington Road (B1190) to the south and the Lincoln-Newark railway (and Hartsholme) to the west. Swallow Beck is the name of the area in the south of Boultham Moor.

To the east is Boultham Park, near the River Witham. Boultham Hall was demolished in 1959. The main road through the estate is Moorland Avenue, which becomes Boultham Park Road at the roundabout near the shops. Also to the west is Tritton Road (B1003). Moorland Avenue used to be the main road into Lincoln, before Tritton Road was built in the 1970s.

History
The area was built as a large council estate in the 1950s, along with nearby Hartsholme.

The parish church, Holy Cross on Skellingthorpe Road, was built in the Second World War. It is also the parish church for Boultham. Local pubs include the Peter de Wint, named after Peter De Wint who married a local woman and lived in the uphill part of Lincoln. Many road names on the estate are named after English artists, such as Charles Haslewood Shannon, J. M. W. Turner, John Romney, Joshua Reynolds, William Kilburn, Thomas Lawrence, Thomas Webster, John Sell Cotman and John Constable.

Education
Boultham Moor has a comprehensive secondary school, Priory Witham Academy. The new buildings stand on the former sports fields of what was previously known as the Boultham Moor Girls Church of England Secondary Modern School until 1974 when it was renamed the Ancaster High School. From 1998 it was renamed again as the Joseph Ruston Technology College.

External links
 History of the Boultham area
 City of Lincoln Council history
 Holy Cross church
 Former Boultham Hall

Areas of Lincoln, England
Housing estates in England